Pontus Renholm (born 16 March 1986) is a Swedish backstroke swimmer representing Stockholmspolisens IF. He currently attends Southern Methodist University.

Personal bests

Long course (50 m)

Short course (25 m)

Clubs
Stockholmspolisens IF

References

1986 births
Living people
SMU Mustangs men's swimmers
Stockholmspolisens IF swimmers
Swedish male backstroke swimmers
21st-century Swedish people